Jeffrey Watson may refer to:
 Jeff Watson (designer) (born 1973), Canadian game designer and professor
 Jeff Watson (journalist) (1942–2023), Australian journalist and  documentary maker
 Jeff Watson (politician) (born 1971), Canadian politician
 Jeffrey Watson (actor), Canadian actor
 Jeff Watson (guitarist) (born 1956), guitarist for rock band Night Ranger
 Jeffrey Watson (priest) (born 1939), Anglican Archdeacon of Ely

See also
 Geoffrey Watson (1921–1998), Australian statistician
 Watson (surname)